Whippany is a unincorporated community located within Hanover Township in Morris County, New Jersey, United States. Whippany's name is derived from the Whippanong Native Americans, a tribe that once inhabited the area. Whippanong meant "place of the willows", named for the trees growing along the banks of the Whippany River.

History
Whippany's Whippany River is an important part of the Munsee, colonial, and industrial history of the town.

The river is protected by the Whippany River Watershed Action Committee.

Munsee Lenape 
Circa 1000, Whippany, along with most of northern New Jersey, was inhabited by the Munsee Lenape. Circa 1500, all of New Jersey was part of the Lenapehoking.

The Munsee harvested mussels from the Whippany River. Arrowheads found in Munsee encampments throughout the nearby Washington Valley suggest that they hunted wolf, elk, and wild turkey for game.

Colonial settlement 
The earliest European settlers to live along the Whippany River can be traced back to 1685. The Whippany River was an integral part of life in the area; it provided water power for the various mills which operated in the town.

Modern history 
The Seeing Eye, the first guide dog school for the blind in the United States, was located in Whippany between 1931 and 1966, before moving to its current campus in nearby Morris Township, adjacent to Fosterfields living historical farm.

Education
Whippany Park High School, public high school
Arrow Academy, Christian school (Pre-K-8)
Memorial Junior School, public middle school
Salem Drive School, public elementary school
Bee Meadow School, public elementary school
Mountview Road School, public elementary school

Notable organizations
Barclays has relocated part of their Manhattan operations to Whippany
J. E. Ashworth & Sons operated a woolen blanket mill
The Whippany Railway Museum, located in the central area
Bayer HealthCare
Communication Techniques, Inc. (CTI), a wholly owned subsidiarity of Herley Industries
The New Jersey Jewish News, a weekly newspaper published by United Jewish Communities of MetroWest New Jersey
New Jersey Starting 5ive
CAE Inc. provides flight simulation and crew training services to the Business Aviation community
 Ukrainian American Cultural Center of New Jersey
Physicians' Desk Reference

Notable people
People who were born in, residents of, or otherwise closely associated with Whippany include:
 Adlan Amagov (born 1986), Strikeforce fighter.
 Sal Canzonieri, guitarist and founding member of the band Electric Frankenstein.
 Damon Daunno (born 1984), actor who starred in the 2019 Broadway revival of Oklahoma!.
 Dan Frischman (born 1959), character actor, noted for his many roles of playing "geek" and "nerd" characters.
 Dan Miller (born 1981), UFC fighter.
 Brian Saxton (born 1972), tight end who played for the New York Giants.
 Linda Tripp (born 1949), former U.S. civil servant who figured in the Monica Lewinsky scandal involving former U.S. President Bill Clinton.

References

External links

"A Place Called Whippany" Its history and contemporary times
CAE North East Training Center
Ukrainian American Cultural Center of New Jersey

Hanover Township, New Jersey
Unincorporated communities in Morris County, New Jersey
Unincorporated communities in New Jersey